Daniel Price was Dean of St Asaph from 1696 until his death on 7 November 1706.

Price was  born in Llanwnnog and educated at Trinity College, Cambridge. He was ordained on 26 May 1678. He held livings at Westmill, Aspenden and Llansantffraed.  John Aubrey noted in his collection of short autobiographies Brief Lives that he was a "mighty Pontificall proud man", and in 1656 that,

References 

17th-century births
1706 deaths
People from Montgomeryshire
Alumni of Trinity College, Cambridge
17th-century Welsh Anglican priests
18th-century Welsh Anglican priests
Deans of St Asaph